Yashkinsky District is an administrative district (raion), one of the nineteen in Kemerovo Oblast, Russia. As a municipal division, it is incorporated as Yashkinsky Municipal District. It is located in the northwest of the oblast. Its administrative center is the urban locality (an urban-type settlement) of Yashkino. Population:  34,131 (2002 Census);  The population of Yashkino accounts for 47.7% of the district's total population.

References

Notes

Sources

Districts of Kemerovo Oblast